Charles George Drake  (July 21, 1920 – September 15, 1998) was a Canadian neurosurgeon known for his work on treating aneurysms.

Born in Windsor, Ontario, he received his BSc and MD degrees from The University of Western Ontario.

From 1974 until 1984 he was Chairman of the Department of Surgery at the University of Western Ontario. In 1986, he co-founded the Robarts Research Institute, which was Canada's only independent medical research centre until its recent merger with the university. While he practiced, he was a member of The Harvey Club of London, the oldest medical club in Canada.

He was the president of the Royal College of Physicians and Surgeons of Canada (1971–1973), the American Association of Neurological Surgeons (1977), the American College of Surgeons (1984–1985), the World Federation of Neurological Societies (1977–1981), the Society of Neurological Surgeons (1980), and the American Surgical Association (1986–1987).

In 1982 he was made an Officer of the Order of Canada and was promoted to Companion in 1998. In 1994 he was inducted in the Canadian Medical Hall of Fame. There is also a metal bust of his head outside the main entrance of London's University Hospital, where Drake practised. The bust was unveiled in 2003 by his wife Ruth and Della Reese, one of his former patients.

He married Ruth Pitts.

Honours

Honorary Degrees 

Honorary degrees

References 
 

Specific

1920 births
1998 deaths
Companions of the Order of Canada
Members of the Order of Ontario
Canadian neurosurgeons
People from Windsor, Ontario
University of Western Ontario alumni
American Surgical Association members
20th-century Canadian physicians
20th-century surgeons